Barndt is a surname. Notable people with the surname include:

Joseph Barndt, American Lutheran pastor and activist
Isidor Barndt (1816–1891), German poet
Susan McWilliams Barndt (born 1977), American political theorist
Tom Barndt (born 1972), American football player